WBQR-LP (104.3 FM) is a non-commercial low-power FM radio station licensed to Brookfield, Wisconsin. broadcasting a classical music format.

References

External links
 

BQR-LP
BQR-LP
Radio stations established in 2017
2017 establishments in Wisconsin